In finance, a specific risk is a risk that affects a very small number of assets. This is sometimes referred to as "unsystematic risk". In a balanced portfolio of assets there would be a spread between general market risk and risks specific to individual components of that portfolio. Determination of the extent of exposure to individual risks is made using models such as Treynor-Black in which the optimal share of a security is inversely proportional to the square of its specific risk.

An example would be news that is specific to either one stock or a group of companies, such as the loss of a patent or a major natural disaster affecting the company's operation.

Unlike systematic risk or market risk, specific risk can be diversified away. In fact, most unsystematic risk is removed by holding a portfolio of about twenty-five to thirty securities.

References

Financial risk